Trouvère, sometimes spelled trouveur, is the Northern French (langue d'oïl) form of the langue d'oc (Occitan) word trobador, the precursor of the modern French word troubadour. Trouvère refers to poet-composers who were roughly contemporary with and influenced by the trobadors, both composing and performing lyric poetry during the High Middle Ages, but while the trobadors composed and performed in Old Occitan, the trouvères used the northern dialects of France. One of the first known trouvère was Chrétien de Troyes ( 1160s–1180s) and the trouvères continued to flourish until about 1300. Some 2130 trouvère poems have survived; of these, at least two-thirds have melodies.

Etymology 
The etymology of the word troubadour and its cognates in other languages is disputed, but may be related to trobar, "to compose, to discuss, to invent", cognative with Old French trover, "to compose something in verses". (For a discussion of the etymology of the word troubadour and its cognates, see troubadour - etymology.)

History 
The modern popular image of the troubadour or trouvère is that of the itinerant musician wandering from town to town, lute on his back. Itinerant singers and performers existed, but they were called jongleurs and minstrels—professional entertainers, usually of somewhat lower social status. Troubadours and trouvères, on the other hand, were often of higher social class and did not typically rely on music making as a trade. They were either poets and composers who were supported by the aristocracy or, just as often, were aristocrats themselves, for whom the creation and performance of music was part of the courtly tradition. However, these distinctions were not always clear, and varied by community 

The texts of these songs are a natural reflection of the society that created them. They often revolve around idealized treatments of courtly love ("fine amors", see grand chant) and religious devotion, although many can be found that take a more frank, earthy look at love. Other genres well represented in the surviving works by trouvères are debate songs known as jeu-partis, pastourelles, dance songs, and chansons de femme (songs with a female perspective).  

Johannes de Grocheio, a Parisian musical theorist of the early 14th century, believed that the most elevated trouvère songs, known as grand chants, inspired kings and noblemen to do great things: "This kind of song is customarily composed by kings and nobles and sung in the presence of kings and princes of the land so that it may move their minds to boldness and fortitude, magnanimity and liberality...".

The surviving music by trouvères is vocal music that is monophonic and mostly syllabic, meaning that only a single melodic line was notated, and the text is presented simply with only one or a few notes per syllable of text. Rhythm is not recorded for most songs, and no instrumentation is specified. Because narrative and visual evidence tells us that instruments were widely used, it is likely that instruments were used in some cases, but trouvère songs were likely also performed unaccompanied. Modern scholars and performers take a variety of approaches to rhythmic interpretation, including using a free rhythmic approach or relatively equal note values throughout, deriving rhythmic ideas from the text, or applying rhythmic modes found in contemporary polyphonic music.

Most trouvère music is strophic, with a single verse of music repeated with multiple verses of text. In some, a repeated one- or two-line refrain is used in each stanza. Some trouvere refrains were also used across multiple different songs and other literary works, creating a network of references.

Women trouvères
There are no extant trouvère songs "in which a woman explicitly claims authorship by naming herself". There are, however, poems in which a woman is named as the author in a rubric or table of contents in a manuscript and others in which a female voice, named or unnamed, participates in a jeu parti (debate poem). Many others are written from a woman's point of view and may have been written by women authors. While early scholars often denied the existence of women trouvères, since the 1980s their existence has been generally accepted and an effort has been made to identify anonymous songs composed by women on the basis of lyrics and contextual clues. The latest monograph on women trouvères identifies eight known by name or title, plus a further six named women who judged jeux partis.

The term troveresse has sometimes been used for women trouvères. The lexicographer Frédéric Godefroy defined the Old French word trouverresse as "she who composes, invents", citing a manuscript of a continuation of Robert of Auxerre's Chronicle. The spelling troverresse also appears in the late 14th-century French–Latin dictionary Aalma, where it corresponds to Latin inuentrix (inventor).

The eight named women trouvères are:

Blanche of Castile (1188–1252)
Dame de la Chaucie
Dame de Gosnai
Gertrude, Duchess of Lorraine (1205–1225)
Lorete
Margot
Maroie de Diergnau
Sainte des Prez

List of trouvères
This is only a partial list. There are 256 named male trouvères known.

Adam de Givenchi
Adam de la Halle
Adenet Le Roi (–)
Andrieu Contredit d'Arras († )
Aubertin d'Airaines
Aubin de Sézanne
Audefroi le Bastart
Baudouin des Auteus
Benoît de Sainte-Maure
Bestournés
Blondel de Nesle
Carasaus
Chastelain de Couci (†1203)
Chardon de Croisilles
Charles d'Anjou
Châtelain d'Arras
Chrétien de Troyes
Colart le Boutellier
Colart le Changeur
Colin Muset
Conon de Béthune ( –; †1220)
Coupart
Ernoul Caupain
Ernoul le Vieux
Étienne de Meaux
Eustache le Peintre de Reims
Gace Brulé (–after 1212)
Gaidifer d'Avion
Gautier de Coincy (1177/8–1236)
Gautier de Dargies (–after 1236)
Gautier d'Espinal († before July 1272)
Gillebert de Berneville
Gilles de Beaumont
Gilles de Vieux-Maisons
Gilles le Vinier
Gobin de Reims
Gontier de Soignies
Guibert Kaukesel
Guillaume d'Amiens
Guillaume de Ferrières (recorded as the Vidame de Chartres)
Guillaume le Vinier (†1245)
Guillaume Veau
Guiot de Dijon
Guiot de Provins
Henry Amion
Henry le Débonnaire
Henri de Lacy (1249–1311)
Hue de la Ferté
Hugues de Berzé
Huon d'Oisi
Huon de Saint-Quentin
Jaque de Dampierre
Jacques Bretel
Jacques de Cambrai
Jacques de Cysoing
Jacques le Vinier
Jean Bodel
Jean Renaut
Jehan de Braine
Jehan Bretel
Jehan le Cuvelier d'Arras
Jehan Erart († )
Jehan Fremaux
Jehan de Grieviler
Jehan de Louvois
Jean le Roux
Jehan de Nuevile
Jehan de Trie
Jocelin de Dijon
Lambert Ferri
Lorris Acot
Mahieu de Gant
Mahieu le Juif
Moniot d'Arras
Moniot de Paris
Oede de la Couroierie
Othon de Grandson
Perrin d'Angicourt
Perrot de Neele
Philippe de Nanteuil
Philippe de Remy (–)
Pierre de Corbie
Pierre de Molins
Pierrekin de la Coupele
Raoul de Beauvais
Raoul de Ferier
Raoul de Soissons
Richard de Fournival (1201–)
Richart de Semilli
Richard I of England
Robert de Blois
Robert de Castel
Robert de Reims
Robert de la Piere
Rutebeuf
Simon d'Authie
Sauvage d'Arraz
Thibaut de Bar
Thibaut de Blazon
Thibaut le Chansonnier (1201–53)
Thierri de Soissons
Thomas de Herier
Vielart de Corbie
Walter of Bibbesworth

List of chansonniers
The following is a list of chansonniers containing trouvère texts and/or music listed by sigla (usually a letter). It is not complete. The same manuscripts may be signified by different sigla in different contexts (i.e., trouabdours or motets) if it contains works of different kinds. These sigla are standard in trouvère studies.

A — Arras, Bibliothèque municipale, 657, the Chansonnier d'Arras
B — Bern, Stadt- und Universitätsbibliothek, 231
C — Bern, Stadt- und Universitätsbibliothek, 389
D — Frankfurt, Universitätsbibliothek, lat. fol. 7
E — London, British Library, Egerton 274
F — Florence, Biblioteca Medicea-Laurenziana, Pluteus 29.1
G — London, Lambeth Palace, Misc. Rolls 1435
H — Modena, Biblioteca Estense, α.R.4.4
I — Oxford, Bodleian Library, Douce 308

K — Paris, Bibliothèque de l'Arsenal, 5198, the Chansonnier de l'Arsenal
L — Paris, Bibliothèque nationale de France, fr. 765
M — Paris, Bibliothèque nationale de France, fr. 844, the Chansonnier du Roi
N — Paris, Bibliothèque nationale de France, fr. 845
O — Paris, Bibliothèque nationale de France, fr. 846, the 
P — Paris, Bibliothèque nationale de France, fr. 847
Q — Paris, Bibliothèque nationale de France, fr. 1109
R — Paris, Bibliothèque nationale de France, fr. 1591
S — Paris, Bibliothèque nationale de France, fr. 12581
T — Paris, Bibliothèque nationale de France, fr. 12615, the Chansonnier de Noailles
U — Paris, Bibliothèque nationale de France, fr. 20050, the Chansonnier St-Germain-des-Prés
V — Paris, Bibliothèque nationale de France, fr. 24406
W — Paris, Bibliothèque nationale de France, fr. 25566
X — Paris, Bibliothèque nationale de France, nouv. acq. fr. 1050, the Chansonnier de Clairambault

Z — Siena, Biblioteca Comunale, H.X.36
a — Rome, Biblioteca Apostolica Vaticana, Reg. Lat. 1490
b — Rome, Biblioteca Apostolica Vaticana, Reg. Lat. 1522
c — Bern, Stadt- und Universitätsbibliothek, A. 95
d — Cambridge, Corpus Christi College, 450
f — Montpellier, Faculté de Médecine, 236
g — Paris, Bibliothèque nationale de France, fr. 1593
i — Paris, Bibliothèque nationale de France, fr.  12483
j — Paris, Bibliothèque nationale de France, nouv. acq. fr.  21677
k — Paris, Bibliothèque nationale de France, fr.  12786
l — Paris, Bibliothèque nationale de France, fr.  22495
m — Paris, Bibliothèque nationale de France, lat. 11412
n — Paris, Bibliothèque nationale de France, lat. 11724
o — London, British Library, Harley 1717
p — Pavia, Biblioteca Universitaria, CXXX.E.5
u — Rome, Biblioteca Apostolica Vaticana, Reg. Lat. 1725
v — Paris, Bibliothèque nationale de France, fr. 1553
za — Zagreb, Metropolitan Library, MR 92
α — Madrid, Biblioteca del Monasterio de El Escorial, S.I.3

See also 

 William the Trouvère

References

Bibliography

.

External links

 

Medieval literature
Medieval French literature

Poets